Pablo José Rivero Rodrigo (born 11 October 1980) is a Spanish actor and writer who became popular in Spain for his over twenty-year long performance as Toni Alcántara in the TV prime-time series Cuéntame cómo pasó. As of 2023, he has published five novels.

Works

Novels
 No volveré a tener miedo (2017)
 Penitencia (2020)
 Las niñas que soñaban con ser vistas (2021)
 La cría (2022)
 Dulce hogar (2023)

Filmography

Film

Television

References

Spanish film actors
Spanish television actors
21st-century Spanish actors
Actors from Madrid
Living people
1980 births
21st-century Spanish male writers
21st-century Spanish novelists
Writers from Madrid